Stanley Henry Prater (12 March 1890 – 12 October 1960) was an Anglo-Indian naturalist in India best known as a long-time affiliate of the Bombay Natural History Society and the Prince of Wales Museum of Western India, Bombay, as ther curator of both institutions for the better part of three decades, and as the author of The Book of Indian Animals.  Prater represented the Anglo-Indian and domiciled British communities in the Bombay Legislative Assembly from 1937 to 1947.

Early life
Prater was born in the Nilgiris (southern India) where his father, William Prater, was a coffee planter. His mother died at birth and he was left by his father in the care of Jesuit priests in an orphanage. As a student of St Mary's High School, Bombay, he spent his school holidays in the Western Ghats.  Experiences here led to a burgeoning interest in natural history.  He joined the Bombay Natural History Society (BNHS) in 1907.  Prater developed his intimate knowledge of the mammals of the Indian subcontinent during the Society's Mammal Survey (1911–1923), during which he was also grievously wounded when he was accidentally shot in the thigh.  He initially worked as an apprenticeship museum assistant and field collector alongside Salim Ali. He attended St Xavier's College, Bombay, where he took a formal course in Biology under Father Ethelbert Blatter.

Curator and editor
In 1923, he became curator of BNHS and the Prince of Wales Museum of Western India, positions he held for 25 years. The same year, Prater travelled to Great Britain to train in modern taxidermy.  Four years later he travelled to the American Museum of Natural History in New York City and the Field Museum of Natural History in Chicago, to learn about techniques of natural history exhibition, gathering knowledge that he brought to bear in the Prince of Wales Museum displays of the next two decades.

During the last 25 years of his tenure at BNHS, Prater became executive editor of Journal of the Bombay Natural History Society.  Among his notable innovations in this position was the series "Wildlife Preservation in India," which appeared in the journal in 1935, and which did much to publicize the problems of conservation in India.  The journal gained much of its international reputation during Prater's stewardship.  Another enduring contribution from this time was his book, The Book of Indian Animals, published in 1948.  The book remains in print, now in its third edition.

Political representative
From 1930 to 1947, Prater was president of the Anglo-Indian and Domiciled European Association, and their representative in the Bombay legislative assembly—services for which he was awarded the OBE in 1943.  In 1946 he became an elected member of the Indian Constituent Assembly, representing the Anglo-Indian community in the early deliberations about the Constitution of India.  He was a member of the Managing Committee of St. George's Hospital, Bombay, a Member of the Senate University of Bombay and a Justice of the Peace.

Prater later travelled to England to join his family who had emigrated to Great Britain.

In England, he continued his links with the Natural History Museum, London and joined the Labour Party.  He died in London in 1960 after a long and debilitating illness.

See also
 Salim Ali
 Bombay Natural History Society
 Indian natural history

Notes and references

1890 births
1960 deaths
Naturalists of British India
Members of the Constituent Assembly of India
British people in colonial India
Bombay State politicians
Members of the Bombay Natural History Society